Alberghini is an Italian surname. Notable people with the surname include:

Chris Alberghini (born 1965), American television director and producer
Delmo Alberghini, American runner
Simone Alberghini (born 1973), Italian opera singer
Tom Alberghini (born 1920), American footballer

Italian-language surnames